Amnioverse is the fourth studio album by British producer and musician Lapalux. It was released on 8 November 2019 under Brainfeeder.

The first single from the album, "Earth", was released on 4 October 2019.

Critical reception

At Metacritic, which assigns a weighted average rating, Amnioverse has received an average score of 82 out of 100, based on 4 critics, indicating "universal acclaim".

Paul Simpson of AllMusic gave the album 4 stars out of 5, writing, "The album contains the producer's most complex, detailed arrangements yet, incorporating sounds of the elements and modular synthesizers into pristinely detailed compositions that progress from near stillness to intense, fractured rhythmic sections." Nick Roseblade of Clash gave the album a 7 out of 10, commenting that "Lapalux has a great touch, but a bit of attention on the parts of the project that feel slightly off could bring out all the fantastic in this record."

Track listing

Personnel
Credits adapted from liner notes.

 Lapalux – production, mixing
 Louisahhh – vocals (1)
 Mike Lesirge – Rhodes piano (2)
 Lilia – vocals (2, 3, 7, 9)
 JFDR – vocals (6, 8)
 Leticia Trandafir – vocals (9)
 Pawws – vocals (10)
 Daddy Kev – mastering
 Dan Medhurst – creative direction, photography
 Owen Gildersleeve – artwork, set design
 Molly Bryan – set assistance, design assistance
 George Oxby – styling
 Sarah Sayuri Hare – model

References

External links
 

2019 albums
Brainfeeder albums